Tamarin Prover is a computer software program for formal verification of cryptographic protocols. It has been used to verify Transport Layer Security 1.3, ISO/IEC 9798, and DNP3 Secure Authentication v5.

References

External links
 Tamarin Prover official website
 David Wong created an introductory video on the Tamarin Prover.

Cryptographic software
Free software